Geertruida Hendrika "Trudy" Ruth (born 20 May 1950) is a retired Dutch sprinter. She competed at the 1972 Summer Olympics in the 400 m event, but failed to reach the final.

References

1950 births
Living people
Athletes (track and field) at the 1972 Summer Olympics
Dutch female sprinters
Olympic athletes of the Netherlands
Sportspeople from Hilversum
Olympic female sprinters